Live at Bull Moose may refer to:

 Live at Bull Moose (Regina Spektor EP), 2005
 Live at Bull Moose (The Decemberists EP), 2011